Carlos Josué Carrillo Chopin (born October 12, 1984) is a Salvadoran professional footballer, who plays as a defender.

Club career

Alianza 
Born in San Salvador, Carrillo began his career in the reserve team of Alianza, before joining Segunda División club, Platense, in 2003.

Isidro Metapán 
Carrillo went on to play with several clubs in the Primera División; these included Isidro Metapán and Municipal Limeño.

Hollywood United Hitmen 
He signed with Hollywood United Hitmen of the USL Premier Development League in mid 2011.

FAS 
Carrillo signed with FAS in August 2011. With FAS, Carrillo reached the Clausura 2013 final, but they were defeated 3–0 by Luis Ángel Firpo.

In the Apertura 2013, they reached the final again, but they were defeated 1–0 by Isidro Metapán.

FAS reached a new final in the Apertura 2015. Carrillo could not dispute that final because of an injury. FAS was defeated 1–0 by Alianza.

Chalatenango 
Carrillo signed with Chalatenango for the Apertura 2016 tournament. With Chalatenango, Carrillo experienced a serious institutional, economic and sports crisis. The most serious episode of this crisis occurred in 2017, when the club's directive did not make the federal registration in the FESFUT.

Sonsonate 
Carrillo signed with Sonsonate for the Apertura 2017 tournament. Carrillo continued with the club for the Clausura 2018. However, with Sonsonate he experienced an administrative, economic and sports crisis in that tournament. Sonsonate played an extra game against Dragón in the Estadio Cuscatlán to define the team descended. Sonsonate won 3–2.

Audaz 
Carrillo signed with Audaz for the Apertura 2018 tournament. With Audaz, Carrillo reached the quarter-finals of that tournament, but he suffered an injury in the second leg of the quarter-finals, a 2–1 defeat against Águila in the Estadio Juan Francisco Barraza.

References

1984 births
Living people
Salvadoran footballers
El Salvador international footballers
Hollywood United Hitmen players
USL League Two players
Association football defenders